Isaac Demone Whitney (born June 22, 1994) is an American football wide receiver who is a free agent. He played college football at USC.

College career
Whitney played two years at USC after transferring from Riverside City College. He also played one season for the Central Oklahoma Bronchos in 2013.

Professional career

Oakland Raiders
Whitney signed with the Oakland Raiders as an undrafted free agent on May 5, 2017. He was waived on September 2, 2017 and was signed to the Raiders' practice squad the next day. He was promoted to the active roster on November 29, 2017.

On September 1, 2018, Whitney was waived by the Raiders.

Houston Texans
On September 18, 2018, Whitney was signed to the Houston Texans' practice squad. He signed a reserve/future contract on January 7, 2019.

On July 27, 2019, Whitney was waived/injured by the Texans and placed on injured reserve.

On September 5, 2020, Whitney was waived by the Texans.

Tampa Bay Buccaneers
On September 30, 2020, Whitney was signed to the Tampa Bay Buccaneers practice squad. He was released on October 22.

Arizona Cardinals
On December 23, 2020, Whitney signed with the practice squad of the Arizona Cardinals. He signed a reserve/future contract on January 5, 2021. He was waived on August 6, 2021.

References

External links
USC Trojans bio
Oakland Raiders bio

1994 births
Living people
Players of American football from Oklahoma
People from Moore, Oklahoma
Sportspeople from Oklahoma City
American football wide receivers
Central Oklahoma Bronchos football players
USC Trojans football players
Oakland Raiders players
Houston Texans players
Tampa Bay Buccaneers players
Arizona Cardinals players